Marionville can refer to:
Marionville, Missouri
Marionville, Virginia
Marionville, Ontario